This is a list of agencies and departments of the federal Government of Nepal.

Federal ministries 

 Ministry of Agriculture and Livestock Development
 Ministry of Culture, Tourism and Civil Aviation
 Ministry of Defence
 Ministry of Education, Science and Technology
 Ministry of Energy, Water Resources and Irrigation
 Ministry of Federal Affairs and General Administration
 Ministry of Finance
 Ministry of Foreign Affairs
 Ministry of Forests and Environment
 Ministry of Health and Population
 Ministry of Home Affairs
 Ministry of Industry, Commerce and Supplies
 Ministry of Information and Communications
 Ministry of Labour, Employment and Social Security
 Ministry of Land Management, Cooperatives and Poverty Alleviation
 Ministry of Law, Justice and Parliamentary Affairs
 Office of the Prime Minister and Council of Ministers
 Ministry of Physical Infrastructure and Transport
 Ministry of Urban Development
 Ministry of Water Supply
 Ministry of Women, Children and Senior Citizen
 Ministry of Youth and Sports

Constitutional bodies 

 Commission for the Investigation of Abuse of Authority
 Office of The Attorney General
 Office of the Auditor General
 Election Commission
 Public Service Commission
 National Human Rights Commission
 National Natural Resources and Fiscal Commission
 National Planning Commission

Departments 

 Department of Archaeology
 Department of Agriculture
 Department of Co-Operatives
 Department of Cottage and Small Industries
 Department of Custom
 Department of Electricity Development
 Department of Food Technology and Quality Control
 Department of Forests and Soil Conservation
 Department of Health Services
 Department of Immigration
 Department of Industry
 Department of Information and Broadcasting
 Department of Information Technology
 Inland Revenue Department
 Department of Land Management and Archive
 Department of Livestock Services
 Department of Mines and Geology
 Department of National Parks and Wildlife Conservation
 Department of Passport
 Postal Services Department
 Department of Printing
 Department of Revenue Investigation
 Department of Roads
 Department of Transport Management

Government agencies 

 Alternative Energy Promotion Center (AEPC)
 Armed Police Force (APF)
 Agriculture Inputs Company Ltd
 Agriculture Information and Communication Center
 B.P. Koirala Memorial Planetarium, Observatory and Science Museum Development Board
 Civil Aviation Authority of Nepal
 Central Bureau of Statistics (CBS)
 Department of National ID and Civil Registration
 Federation of Nepalese Chambers of Commerce and Industry (FNCCI)
 Financial Comptroller General Office (FCGO)
 Foreign Employment Promotion Board
 Hydroelectricity Investment and Development Company Limited
 Higher Secondary Education Board
 Land Management Training Centre
 Nepal Tourism Board
 Nepal Law Commission
 National Planning Commission (NPC)
 Nepal Police
 Nepali Army
 Nepal Red Cross Society
 Nepal Agricultural Research Council (NARC)
 Nepal Telecom
 National Information Technology Center (NITC)
 Nepal Academy of Tourism and Hotel Management
 Nepal Airlines Corporation
 Nepal Academy of Science and Technology (NAST)
 Nepal Health Research Council
 Nepal Medical Council
 Nepal Standards and Metrology Department
 National Sports Council
 National Information Commission
 Office of Controller of Certification
 Office of the Controller of Examinations
 Office of Company Registrar
 Public Procurement Monitoring Office (PPMO)
 Rastriya Prasaran Grid Company Limited (RPGCL)
 Revenue Administration Training Center
 Social Welfare Council Nepal
 University Grants Commission
 Vocational and Skill Development Training Center
 Water and Energy Commission
 Policy Research Institute (PRI)

See also

 Government of Nepal

References

 
Government agencies
Nepal
Agencies